Khagaria Lok Sabha constituency is one of the 40 Lok Sabha (parliamentary) constituencies in Bihar state in eastern India.

Assembly segments

Since last delimitation exercise, from 2009 Lok Sabha elections Khagaria Lok Sabha constituency comprised the following six Vidhan Sabha (legislative assembly) segments:

Members of Parliament 

Source:

General elections 2019

General elections 2014

References

See also
 Khagaria district
 List of Constituencies of the Lok Sabha

Lok Sabha constituencies in Bihar
Politics of Khagaria district
Politics of Saharsa district
Politics of Samastipur district